Staryye Sulli (İśke Sülle) is a rural locality (a selo) and the administrative centre of Starosullinsky Selsoviet, Yermekeyevsky District, Bashkortostan, Russia. The population was 342 as of 2010. There are 3 streets.

Geography 
Staryye Sulli is located 17 km north of Yermekeyevo (the district's administrative centre) by road. Novye Sulli is the nearest rural locality.

References 

Rural localities in Yermekeyevsky District